In Roman mythology, Picumnus was a god of fertility, agriculture, matrimony, infants and children.  He may have been the same god as Sterquilinus.  His brother was Pilumnus.

Fertility gods
Roman gods
Agricultural gods
Childhood gods